The Academy of Sciences Glacier (Lednik Akademii Nauk), is a large ice cap on Komsomolets Island, Severnaya Zemlya, Russian Federation.

It is the largest in Severnaya Zemlya and is also the largest single glacier formation of Russia.

History
This glacier was named after the Soviet Academy of Sciences by the 1930–1932 expedition to the archipelago led by Georgy Ushakov and Nikolay Urvantsev.

Geography
It covers almost two thirds of Komsomolets island, except for an unglaciated area at the northern end.

This vast ice cap is located on the southern side of the island, stretching from coast to coast, with the Laptev Sea on its eastern side at Krenkel Bay, the Red Army Strait in the south and the Kara Sea on the west at Zhuravlev Bay.

In popular culture

The Academy of Sciences Glacier is portrayed in the 2021 film The Tomorrow War as the site which a group attempts to prevent the escape of aliens from a ship, 28 years before they do, without detection and spread across the planet.

See also
List of glaciers in Russia
Ice drilling

References

External links

Satellite Image Atlas of Glaciers of the World
A stable isotope record of an ice core from Akademii Nauk ice cap
Akademii Nauk ice cap, Severnaya Zemlya - an example of a glacier grown in Late Holocene
The Glaciology of the Russian High Arctic from Landsat Imagery

Glaciers of Severnaya Zemlya
Bodies of water of Krasnoyarsk Krai
Ice caps of Russia